Robin Korving (born 29 July 1974 in Heerhugowaard, North Holland) is a former hurdler from the Netherlands, best known for winning the bronze medal at the 1998 European Championships in Budapest, Hungary. He was Holland's leading hurdler in the 1990s, winning eight national titles in a row (1993-2000). He got injured prior to the 2000 Summer Olympics in Sydney, Australia.

Competition record

References

1974 births
Living people
Dutch male hurdlers
European Athletics Championships medalists
People from Heerhugowaard
Competitors at the 1995 Summer Universiade
Competitors at the 1997 Summer Universiade
Sportspeople from North Holland